Mount Buchon, also known as the San Luis Range, is a mountain range in San Luis Obispo County, California.

References 

Mountain ranges of San Luis Obispo County, California
California Coast Ranges